Jonas Alver (born 6 June 1973), better known by his stage name Alver, is a Norwegian bass player.  He is known for his work in the black metal bands Emperor and Dødheimsgard.

Discography 
 Dødheimsgard – Monumental Possession
 Emperor – Anthems to the Welkin at Dusk

References 

Living people
Norwegian heavy metal bass guitarists
Norwegian male bass guitarists
Norwegian black metal musicians
1973 births
21st-century Norwegian bass guitarists
21st-century Norwegian male musicians